Wings of Victory is the fiftieth album by American singer/guitarist Glen Campbell, released in 1992 (see 1992 in music).

Track listing

 "Searchin' Love" (John R. Yowell) – (3:19)
 "Shelter from the Storm" (Geoff Thurman, Becky Thurman) – (3:31)
 "Second to None" (Geoff Thurman, Rob Grandi) – (3:51)
 "The Eyes of Innocence" (Becky Thurman, Gary Lunn) – (4:45)
 "Only One Life" (Jimmy Webb) – (4:08)
 "Who's Minding the Garden" (Bruce Bouton, Alice Randall) – (3:27)
 "On The Wings Of His Victory" (Bob Corbin) – (3:15)
 "The Desert" (Gino Conti) – (3:34)
 "Simple Things" (Geoff Thurman, Jamie Page) – (3:29)
 "I Will Arise" (Arr. by Jimmy Webb) – (2:52)

Personnel
Glen Campbell – vocals, acoustic guitar
Tom Hemby – acoustic guitars and electric guitars
Mark Casstevens – acoustic guitar
Dann Huff – electric guitar
Gary Lunn – bass guitar
Lonnie Wilson – drums
Paul Leim – drums
Shane Keister – keyboards, synthesizer
Strings – The A Strings
Background vocals – Geoff Thurman, Curtis Young, Bergen White, First Call, Boys Choir of Harlem

Production
Producers – Glen Campbell, Ken Harding, Geoff Thurman, Bergen White
Arranged by Bergen White
Recorded by Brent King at Eleven Eleven Sound, Nashville, TN
Production Assistant – Debbie Harding
Mixed by Ronnie Brookshire, Bryan Lenox, Patrick Kelly, Brent King
Mastered by Hank Williams at Master Mix, Nashville, TN
Overdubs recorded at Capstone Studio, House Of David, Studio at Moles End, Omni Sound Studio, Quad Studio, Nashville, TN, Clinton Recording Studio, New York, NY
Photography – Mark Tucker
Art direction – Larry Newlon/Powell Creative Group

Charts

Singles – CCM charts (United States)

References

Glen Campbell albums
1992 albums